Segariu is a comune (municipality) in the Province of South Sardinia in the Italian region Sardinia, located about  northwest of Cagliari and about  east of Sanluri.

Segariu borders the following municipalities: Furtei, Guasila, Villamar.

Demographic evolution

References

Cities and towns in Sardinia